Maxwell William Hood (25 July 1925 – 12 December 2012) was an Australian rules footballer who played with Richmond in the Victorian Football League (VFL).

Notes

External links 

Max Hood's playing statistics from The VFA Project
	
		
		
1925 births		
2012 deaths		
Australian rules footballers from Victoria (Australia)		
Richmond Football Club players
Camberwell Football Club players